Hunter v Canary Wharf Ltd [1997] UKHL 14 is an English tort law case on the subject of private nuisance. Several hundred claimants alleged that Canary Wharf Ltd, in constructing One Canada Square, had caused nuisance to them by impairing their television signal. The House of Lords held unanimously that such interference could not amount to an actionable nuisance; the nuisance was equivalent to loss of a view, or of a prospect, which had never previously been actionable.

Facts
Canary Wharf Ltd undertook to construct a large tower (now known as the One Canada Square), for commercial and residential purposes. The tower was completed in November 1990, reaching 250 metres in height, and 50 metres squared in area. However, the tower, being situated less than 10 kilometres from the BBC's primary television transmitter, in Crystal Palace, interfered with the reception of several hundred home owners. It was submitted that before the construction of the tower (in the summer of 1989), television reception had been good. The issue was remedied in April 1991, whereby a broadcast relay was installed in Balfron Tower, to transmit television signal into the area affected. Nevertheless, the claimants alleged that the large metallic structure had interrupted their television reception, and claimed private nuisance – for loss of enjoyment – and remuneration for their wasted television license fee, for the time their signal had been impaired.

Judgment
The judgment of the House of Lords concentrated on two aspects of private nuisance.

The first issue was who could be seen to have a legitimate right in land, a requirement to sue in nuisance. The Lords  rejected the interim case of Khorasandjian v Bush, where it had been found that no proprietary interest in a property was required to bring an action. In doing so, they upheld the findings of Malone v Laskey, establishing again that only householders with a right to a property could commence actions in nuisance. The second issue was that, after establishing who could bring an action for nuisance, what rights were protected by the tort. Lord Lloyd in his judgment referred to three areas of private nuisance:

It was pointed out that, as stated in Walter v Selfe, any nuisance must be relatively substantial, and not merely a 'fanciful complaint'. It had been established previously that a drop in the value of land would not necessarily allow an action in nuisance. The issue at hand however was whether it would be fair in the circumstances to impose restrictions upon land owners with regard to their right to build properties.

Lord Goff referred to several authorities in support of the common law standing that merely blocking a property owner's view, airflow, or light, is not actionable. From this, he stated that: "more is required than the mere presence of a neighbouring building to give rise to an actionable private nuisance." On the idea that it would be more desirable to allow nuisance claims from someone without an interest in land, Lord Goff said the following.

Whilst it was agreed upon that there had been no actionable nuisance in the instant case, the Lords differed in their interpretations of whether an interference to television reception could constitute a nuisance. Lord Cooke found that an interference by a building could amount to a nuisance, if it was unreasonable, or a misuse of the defendant's land; Lord Hoffmann and Lord Hope however stated that as the right to television reception is not obtained, interference with it could not amount to a nuisance:

Significance

Before Hunter it had been judicially stated in Bridlington Relay v Yorkshire Electricity Board that it was not thought interference to television reception could give rise to an actionable nuisance, by Buckley J:

However, these remarks had been made obiter dicta, and thus held no judicial authority. The legal basis on which a complaint of television reception was considered to take place was that of loss of a view, or prospect.

See also
Nuisance in English law
Privacy in English law
English tort law

Notes

References
P Cane, 'What a nuisance' (1997) 113 Law Quarterly Review 515

External links
 Full judgment of Hunter v Canary Wharf Ltd

English tort case law
English nuisance cases
House of Lords cases
1997 in case law
1997 in British law